Hymenocallis venezuelensis is a bulb-forming herb native to Venezuela but naturalized in parts of Peru. Type location is near Guarico. Camaguan, Venezuela.

Hymenocallis venezuelensis is a small bulb-forming herb with narrow leaves and an umble of drooping white flowers. Raymúndez & Scale-Xenia discuss in some detail the morphological and anatomical differences between this and other Hymenocallis species from Venezuela.

References

venezuelensis
Flora of Venezuela
Flora of Peru
Plants described in 1963